Hyannisport Wharf was a railroad wharf in the Hyannisport section of Hyannis, Massachusetts.

History
In 1850, the railroad was given permission to extend to Hyannis, where steamships could dock to reach Martha's Vineyard and Nantucket. The Cape Cod Railroad (successor to the Cape Cod Branch Railroad) began service to Hyannisport Wharf in July 1854.

The Cape Cod Railroad became part of the Old Colony Railroad in 1872, and in turn part of the New York, New Haven and Hartford Railroad in 1893. The line between Hyannisport and Hyannis was abandoned in 1937; most of the right-of-way is now Old Colony Road, while part of the fill for the wharf remains extant.

References

Barnstable, Massachusetts
Old Colony Railroad Stations on Cape Cod
Stations along Old Colony Railroad lines
Former railway stations in Massachusetts
Railway stations opened in 1854
Railway stations closed in 1872